Robert Warren (1829–1915) was an Irish ornithologist.
Warren was born in Cork. In his early years he corresponded with fellow Irish ornithologist William Thompson. In 1851 he moved to Moyview, County Sligo, where he studied the birds of Killala Bay, Bartragh Island and the River Moy. In 1900 he was co-author with Richard J. Ussher of The Birds of Ireland.

In Castleconnor a walkway is named after him.

Bibliography

References

Sources 
 

1829 births
1915 deaths
Irish ornithologists